Lorenzo Casetti (born 14 September 1993) is an Italian ice hockey player for Asiago Hockey and the Italian national team.

He represented Italy at the 2021 IIHF World Championship.

References

External links

1993 births
Living people
Asiago Hockey 1935 players
Bolzano HC players
Italian ice hockey defencemen
Sportspeople from Trento